Amaresh Roy Chowdhury (born 18 September 1928) is a Bangladeshi classical vocalist of the Indian sub-continent. He was awarded Ekushey Padak in 2016 by the Government of Bangladesh for his contribution to classical music.

Early life

Amaresh Roy Chowdhury was born in the village of Chouddoroshi in the district of Faridpur of the presidencies and provinces of British India on September 18, 1928. His parents were Avinash Roy Chowdhury and Rajlakshmi Roy Chowdhury. They belonged to the family of Roy Bahadur Mahendra Narayan Roy Chowdhury of Faridpur.

He moved to Rajshahi after the liberation war of Bangladesh in 1971, and  has been living there with his wife Sonali Roy Chowdhury and family since then.

Musical journey
When he was in fifth grade, he started learning classical music. He started training from Pandit Sudhir Lal Chakrabarty, a famous music composer of the subcontinent. After his sudden death, Amaresh went to Harihar Shukla, another famous musician from Sirajganj, father of the famous Indian singer Haimanti Sukla, for vocal training. Afterwards he received training on Dhrupada, Khayal and Thumri from Sangeetacharya Tarapada Chakraborty. He also learned modern songs and raagas from composer Nikhil Chandra Sen, and received vocal training from Manas Chakroborty. After passing his matriculation in 1945, he continued learning and practicing classical music.

Career
He has taught music at Shilpashram Lalitkala Academy in Rajshshi.

Notable contributions
Amaresh Roy Chowdhury noted down the tunes of the songs by Kazi Nazrul Islam from their original records and preserved them in notations.

Awards
 Sanket Sangskritik Goshthi Award (1981)
 Ustad Gul Mohammad Memorial Award by Sangeet Academy (1982)
 Gunijan Sammanona by Bangladesh Shilpakala Academy (1997)
 "Pandit" Title given by Noborupi, Dinajpur(2000).
 National Leader Shaheed “AHM Kamaruzzaman Sammanona Smarok” (2010)
 "Rabindra Padak"” by Jatiya Rabindra Sangeet Sammilan Parishad (2014)
 Shilpakala Padak by Bangladesh Shilpakala Academy (2014)
 Ekushey Padak (2016)

References

Living people
1928 births
20th-century Bangladeshi male singers
20th-century Bangladeshi singers
Bangladeshi Hindus
Recipients of the Ekushey Padak in arts